The 1935 New Mexico A&M Aggies football team was an American football team that represented New Mexico College of Agriculture and Mechanical Arts (now known as New Mexico State University) as a member of the Border Conference during the 1935 college football season.  In their seventh year under head coach Jerry Hines, the team compiled a 7–1–2 record, finished second in the conference, played  to a tie in the 1936 Sun Bowl, and outscored all opponents by a total of 210 to 42. The team played its six home games at Quesenberry Field in Las Cruces, New Mexico.

Three of the Aggies' players were selected to the 1935 All-Border Conference football team: halfback Lauro Apodaca; guard Anthony George; and halfback Lem Pratt.

Schedule

References

New Mexico AandM
New Mexico State Aggies football seasons
New Mexico AandM Aggies football